Novoye Baryatino is a rural locality (a selo) and the administrative centre of Kazadayevsky Selsoviet, Sterlitamaksky District, Bashkortostan, Russia. The population was 613 as of 2010. There are 25 streets.

Geography 
Novoye Baryatino is located 11 km north of Sterlitamak (the district's administrative centre) by road. Muravey is the nearest rural locality.

References 

Rural localities in Sterlitamaksky District